Dobrovlje may refer to:
Dobrovlje, Braslovče, a village in Braslovče, central-eastern Slovenia
Dobrovlje, Zreče, a village in Zreče, eastern Slovenia
Dobrovlje pri Mozirju, a village in Mozirje, northeastern Slovenia